Jaffa Phonix is a Palestinian band whose music consists of electronica, hip hop and big beat. The current band members are Faisal Abu Ghaben (composer/vocalist), Ali Abu Ghaben (lyricist/vocalist), DJ Feedo (turntablist).

The Ghaben brothers were born in Kuwait and fled to Egypt after the Gulf War, because of the PLO's support of Saddam Hussein.

The lyrics on their first album, Resolution 194, dealt with the Palestinian refugees' cause and the effects on Palestinian society after the 1947–1949 Palestine war. After several live performances, the band started to deviate from hip hop to a style which combined big beat and dance instrumentals with varied lyrical elements.

Jaffa Phonix first emerged from the underground hip/hop scene in Egypt, and garnered mainstream recognition after a track from their first album, "Osti" (My Story), was played on the Egypt's biggest radio station, Nile FM.

The band's performance took place in Cairo, November 24, 2006, was in front of almost 15,000 people at the second SOS music festival.

References

Palestinian musical groups